Hexylresorcinol is an organic compound with local anaesthetic, antiseptic, and anthelmintic properties.

It is available for use topically on small skin infections, or as an ingredient in throat lozenges. It is marketed as S.T.37 by Numark Laboratories, Inc. (in a 0.1% solution) for oral pain relief and as an antiseptic. Sytheon Ltd., USA markets hexylresorcinol (trade named Synovea HR). Johnson & Johnson uses hexylresorcinol in its Neutrogena, Aveno, and RoC skincare products as an anti-aging cream. Hexylresorcinol has been used commercially by many cosmetic and personal care companies, such as Mary Kay, Clarins, Unilever, Murad, Facetheory, Arbonne, and many small and large companies. As an anthelmintic, hexylresorcinol was sold under the brand Crystoids.

A study published in Chemical Research in Toxicology  shows that 4-hexylresorcinol used as a food additive (E-586) exhibits some estrogenic activity, i.e. resembles action of the female sex hormone estrogen. However, recent study published in Applied Sciences  shows that 4-hexylresorcinol did not change the expression of estrogen receptor-α, -β, or p-ERK1/2 in MCF-7 cells. In an ovariectomized animal model, the 4HR group showed similar levels of ERα, ERβ, and prolactin expression in the pituitary gland compared to the solvent only group, while the estradiol group showed higher levels. Serum prolactin levels were similar between the 4HR and solvent only groups.

In one study, 4-hexylresorcinol increased the shelf life of shrimp by reducing melanosis (black spots).

In mice with cancer, 4-hexylresorcinol inhibited NF-κB and extended their survival rate.

References 

Antiseptics
Local anesthetics
Anthelmintics
Alkylresorcinols
E-number additives
Food antioxidants